Florence Parry Heide (February 27, 1919 – October 23, 2011) was a bestselling American children's writer.

Early life 

Born in Pittsburgh, Heide spent most of her childhood in Punxsutawney, Pennsylvania. Her father, who was a banker, died when Heide was two years old. After two years of studying at Wilson College in Chambersburg, Pennsylvania, she transferred to UCLA, graduating in 1939. She worked in advertising and public relations in New York City before returning to Pittsburgh during World War II and became publicity director of The Pittsburgh Playhouse. She met her husband, Donald C. Heide, in October, 1943. They married six weeks later, on November 27, 1943.

After the war, she and her husband moved to Kenosha, Wisconsin. He began a private law practice where he worked until his retirement in 1982. She devoted herself to her children and began her career as a children's author after all five of them were in school.

Career 

Her first book, Maximilian, was published in 1967. She published more than 100 books for children and youth – from picture books to adolescent novels – and several collections of poetry. She also collaborated with Sylvia Van Clief to write a number of songs. Her best-known works are a series of books about the adventures of a boy named Treehorn, which includes the titles The Shrinking of Treehorn (1971),  Treehorn's Treasure (1981), and Treehorn’s Wish (1986), all of which were illustrated by Edward Gorey. She also worked with illustrators Jules Feiffer and Lane Smith and won awards for her work. Under the pen name Alex B. Allen, Heide and at least two co-authors contributed texts to the illustrated Springboard sports series published by Albert Whitman of Chicago.

Personal life 

Heide was the mother of five children, including authors Judith Heide Gilliland and Roxanne Heide Pierce, with whom she co-wrote several other books. She had eight grandchildren and four great-grandchildren.

Heide was known in Kenosha for the Fourth of July parade she organized each year. Hundreds of children with their bikes decorated would gather outside her home and ride twice around her block to the beat of a drum. The parade continues each year in her honor.  She received an honorary degree from Carthage College in 1979. Heide died in her sleep on October 23, 2011. Upon her death, she gifted a large portion of her personal collection of children's books to the Center for Children's Literature at Carthage College.

References

External links
Short biography at Candlewick Press
Short biography at Houghton Mifflin
 
 Alex B. Allen (joint pseudonym) at LC Authorities

1919 births
2011 deaths
American children's writers
People from Kenosha, Wisconsin
Writers from Pittsburgh
Writers from Wisconsin
Wilson College (Pennsylvania) alumni
University of California, Los Angeles alumni